Uttarakhand Open University is a State Open University located in the city of Haldwani in the Indian state of Uttarakhand.

The university was established by an Act of Uttarakhand Legislative Assembly on 31 October 2005. UOU is recognized by Distance Education Bureau, University Grants Commission and listed in Association of Indian Universities

University offers undergraduate and postgraduate programs. It also offers Phd Degrees but on a full-time basis as directed by UGC.

MoU
The University has signed Memorandum of Understanding, or MoUs with Abhinav Knowledge Services, Tata Motors, Hiltron Calc, University18, IETS, IKC India  and various others.

Hello Haldwani community radio 
Hello Haldwani is the Hindi language community radio station of the Uttarakhand Open University, accompanied by its website, which serves as an information portal and provides online access to radio broadcasts. The radio service is broadcast from Uttarakhand open university  in haldwani. The target audience are communities of Uttarakhand. The station began transmission on 2 November 2012. It airs its programs in FM 91.2 MHz.

References

Haldwani-Kathgodam
Universities in Uttarakhand
Education in Nainital
Educational institutions established in 2005
2005 establishments in Uttarakhand
Open universities in India